Dallington is a suburb of Christchurch, New Zealand, on the north-east side of the city.

It is bounded mainly by the Avon River, stretching in a circular area from the intersection of Gayhurst Road, Dallington Terrace and Locksley Avenue along to New Brighton Road, North Parade and Banks Avenue where it meets the intersection at the other end of Dallington Terrace and River Road.  Its neighbouring suburbs are Burwood, Shirley, Richmond, and Avonside.

It was originally named Dudley's Creek after a local farmer, John Dudley (1808–1861). Henry Jekyll (1844–1913) bought the farm about 1879, naming it Dallington after a Northamptonshire estate.

On 4 September 2010, it was severely hit by a 7.1 magnitude earthquake, causing immense damage. Consequently, the St Paul's parish church and school which had suffered greatly from the effects of the quake, were forced to relocate their church services to the Marian College chapel and the students to the Catholic Cathedral College site, for the following couple of years estimated that it would take to rebuild. The college accommodated the entire primary school community of St Paul's School for a short time. But the February 2011 Christchurch earthquake (6.3 magnitude) caused far worse devastation to the city than the September 2010 earthquake. Large areas of Dallington were placed into a residential red zone, under which houses were acquired and demolished by the Crown. Parts of Catholic Cathedral College were under the unstable 400-ton dome of the Catholic Cathedral. Because the dome was in imminent danger of collapse, the college left the site and St Paul's School was moved to a site which the Minister of Education made available in Champion St.

Demographics

Dallington had a population of 2,361 at the 2018 New Zealand census, an increase of 141 people (6.4%) since the 2013 census, and a decrease of 330 people (-12.3%) since the 2006 census. There were 918 households. There were 1,185 males and 1,176 females, giving a sex ratio of 1.01 males per female. The median age was 36.4 years (compared with 37.4 years nationally), with 462 people (19.6%) aged under 15 years, 489 (20.7%) aged 15 to 29, 1,014 (42.9%) aged 30 to 64, and 396 (16.8%) aged 65 or older.

Ethnicities were 81.3% European/Pākehā, 14.1% Māori, 6.0% Pacific peoples, 8.0% Asian, and 3.2% other ethnicities (totals add to more than 100% since people could identify with multiple ethnicities).

The proportion of people born overseas was 21.2%, compared with 27.1% nationally.

Although some people objected to giving their religion, 49.8% had no religion, 36.5% were Christian, 0.4% were Hindu, 1.3% were Muslim, 0.6% were Buddhist and 3.6% had other religions.

Of those at least 15 years old, 330 (17.4%) people had a bachelor or higher degree, and 408 (21.5%) people had no formal qualifications. The median income was $29,900, compared with $31,800 nationally. The employment status of those at least 15 was that 936 (49.3%) people were employed full-time, 273 (14.4%) were part-time, and 63 (3.3%) were unemployed.

Education
Banks Avenue School is a contributing primary school catering for years 1 to 6.

References

Suburbs of Christchurch